The Montevideo Convention on the Rights and Duties of States is a treaty signed at Montevideo, Uruguay, on December 26, 1933, during the Seventh International Conference of American States. The Convention codifies the declarative theory of statehood as accepted as part of customary international law. At the conference, United States President Franklin D. Roosevelt and Secretary of State Cordell Hull declared the Good Neighbor Policy, which opposed U.S. armed intervention in inter-American affairs. The convention was signed by 19 states. The acceptance of three of the signatories was subject to minor reservations. Those states were Brazil, Peru and the United States.

The convention became operative on December 26, 1934. It was registered in League of Nations Treaty Series on January 8, 1936.

The conference is notable in U.S. history, since one of the U.S. representatives was Dr. Sophonisba Preston Breckinridge, the first U.S. female representative at an international conference.

Background

In most cases, the only avenue open to self-determination for colonial or national ethnic minority populations was to achieve international legal personality as a nation-state. The majority of delegations at the International Conference of American States represented independent states that had emerged from former colonies. In most cases, their own existence and independence had been disputed or opposed by one or more of the European colonial empires. They agreed among themselves to criteria that made it easier for other dependent states with limited sovereignty to gain international recognition.

Contents of the convention 
The convention sets out the definition, rights and duties of statehood. Most well-known is Article 1, which sets out the four criteria for statehood that have been recognized by international organizations as an accurate statement of customary international law:

Furthermore, the first sentence of Article 3 explicitly states that "The political existence of the state is independent of recognition by the other states." This is known as the declarative theory of statehood. It stands in conflict with the alternative constitutive theory of statehood: a state exists only insofar as it is recognized by other states. It should not be confused with the Estrada doctrine. "Independence" and "sovereignty" are not mentioned in article 1.

An important part of the convention was a prohibition of using military force to gain sovereignty. According to Article 11 of the Convention,

Furthermore, Article 11 reflects the contemporary Stimson Doctrine, and is now a fundamental part of international law through article 2 paragraph 4 of the Charter of the United Nations.

Parties

The 17 states that have ratified this convention are limited to the Americas.

Notes

A further three states signed the Convention on 26 December 1933, but have not ratified it.

The only state to attend the Seventh International Conference of American States, where the convention was agreed upon, which did not sign it was Bolivia.  Costa Rica, which did not attend the conference, later signed the convention.

Customary international law

As a restatement of customary international law, the Montevideo Convention merely codified existing legal norms and its principles and therefore does not apply merely to the signatories, but to all subjects of international law as a whole.

The European Union, in the principal statement of its Badinter Committee, follows the Montevideo Convention in its definition of a state: by having a territory, a population, and a political authority. The committee also found that the existence of states was a question of fact, while the recognition by other states was purely declaratory and not a determinative factor of statehood.

Switzerland, although not a member of the European Union, adheres to the same principle, stating that "neither a political unit needs to be recognized to become a state, nor does a state have the obligation to recognize another one. At the same time, neither recognition is enough to create a state, nor does its absence abolish it."

See also
 Sovereignty
 Foreign policy of the Franklin D. Roosevelt administration

References

Further reading
 Stuart, Graham. "The Results of the Good Neighbor Policy In Latin America' World Affairs 102#3 (September, 1939), pp. 166-170 online

External links 

Original text at UN Treaties Series, Registration Number: 3802
Searching for a symbol The Montevideo Convention and Taiwan/ROC

History of Montevideo
1933 in the United States
Interwar-period treaties
Treaties concluded in 1933
Treaties entered into force in 1934
Treaties of Argentina
Treaties of Vargas-era Brazil
Treaties of Chile
Treaties of Colombia
Treaties of Cuba
Treaties of the Dominican Republic
Treaties of Ecuador
Treaties of El Salvador
Treaties of Guatemala
Treaties of Haiti
Treaties of Honduras
Treaties of Mexico
Treaties of Nicaragua
Treaties of Panama
Treaties of Paraguay
Treaties of Peru
Treaties of the United States
Treaties of Uruguay
Treaties of Venezuela